Gmina Platerówka is a rural gmina (administrative district) in Lubań County, Lower Silesian Voivodeship, in south-western Poland, on the Czech border.

Neighbouring gminas
Gmina Platerówka is bordered by the town of Lubań and the gminas of Leśna, Lubań, Siekierczyn and Sulików. It also borders the Czech Republic.

Villages
The gmina contains the villages of Platerówka, Przylasek, Włosień and Zalipie.

References

Platerowka
Lubań County